Knud Nielsen may refer to:

 Knud Aage Nielsen (born 1937), Danish badminton player
 Knud Nielsen (rower) (born 1936), Danish rower